The Balter Brewing Company is an Australian craft brewery business based in Currumbin, Queensland.

The company was established in 2016 by multiple investors including Australian Surfing Champions Mick Fanning, Joel Parkinson, Josh Kerr and Bede Durbidge 

Balter Brewing Company was sold to Carlton & United Breweries in 2019. CUB has since been sold to Asahi Breweries.

Tins of Glory World Tinnie Hurling Championships is a version of table shuffleboard using beer cans instead of pucks started in 2017 at the Currumbin brewery.

See also

Beer in Australia
List of breweries in Australia

References

External links 
 

Australian beer brands
Australian companies established in 2016
Food and drink companies established in 2016
Manufacturing companies based on the Gold Coast, Queensland
Currumbin, Queensland